Chervyen District is a second-level administrative subdivision (raion) of Minsk Region, Belarus. The capital of the town is Chervyen.

Notable residents 
 Ibrahim Kanapacki (1949, Smilavičy town– 2005), Belarusian Lipka Tatar religious, political, and cultural leader
 Stanisław Moniuszko (1819, Ubel village – 1872), Polish and Belarusian composer

References

 
Districts of Minsk Region